Romanovka is a rural locality (a village) in Alginsky Selsoviet, Davlekanovsky District, Bashkortostan, Russia. The population was 273 as of 2010. There are 3 streets.

Geography 
Romanovka is located 21 km northwest of Davlekanovo (the district's administrative centre) by road. Alexandrovka is the nearest rural locality.

References 

Rural localities in Davlekanovsky District